"Hold You Down" is a song by American musician DJ Khaled featuring fellow American musicians Chris Brown, August Alsina, Future and Jeremih from the former's eighth studio album I Changed a Lot. It was released on August 3, 2014 as the second single, becoming certified gold by Recording Industry Association of America (RIAA) on June 4, 2015. The track topped the US Hot R&B/Hip-Hop Airplay chart and is August Alsina's first top 40 entry as well as DJ Khaled's seventh.

Music video
The music video released coinciding with the single on August 11, 2014 via WorldStarHipHop and made its national television debut on the popular program 106 & Park on BET as well as MTV Jams. The music video was directed by Gil Green and features Khaled's newly endorsed Bang & Olufsen headphones. In the video, all artists of the song are seen in a mansion performing the song. The music video was taken down from YouTube in 2017 after Khaled was involved in a lawsuit with Bang & Olufsen (makers of the headphones advertised throughout the video).

Remix
On November 3, 2014, DJ Khaled released the remix for "Hold You Down". On the remix, Usher sings the hook from the original song, and Rick Ross, Fabolous and Ace Hood each rap a verse. In the background of the remix, a skit from the music video of the original song can be heard.

Charts

Weekly charts

Year-end charts

Certifications

Release history

References 

2014 singles
2014 songs
DJ Khaled songs
Chris Brown songs
August Alsina songs
Future (rapper) songs
Jeremih songs
Songs written by Chris Brown
Music videos directed by Gil Green
Songs written by Jeremih
Republic Records singles
Songs written by Future (rapper)
Songs written by Lee on the Beats
Songs written by DJ Khaled
Songs written by Bkorn
Songs written by Dre (record producer)